Bucky Calabrese (8 June 1927 - 6 May 1995), was an American upright bassist.

Life and career
Born Frederick Philip in Hicksville, New York, Calabrese was trained at the Hartnett School of Music and privately with Charles Mingus and Clyde Lombardi. In 1957 he played with Ray Eberle and Dizzy Gillespie. He then performed with Sal Salvador (1958) and Kai Winding (1959). In 1962 he toured and recorded with Stan Kenton, and in 1963 he performed with Edmond Hall and his dixieland band in New York City. He remained in New York City in 1964 and 1965, performing in bands led by Eddie Condon and Max Kaminsky. In 1968 he performed in a duo with pianist Teddy Wilson, and in the early 1970s he performed in a trio with pianist Dave McKenna. In his later career he performed and recorded with Doc Cheatham.

Discography (in selection) 
 1962: Adventures In Time, A Concerto For Orchestra (Capitol Records), with Stan Kenton.
 1972: From Puerto Rico To Soulsville (Zanzee), with Ray Rivera
 1973: Cookin' At Michael's Pub (Halcyon Records), with Dave McKenna
 1986: Where Have You Been? (DRG Records), with Elisabeth Welch
 1987: Live At The West End Cafe New York City (Bean Records), with Pete Compo Jazz Violin Quartet
 1992: The Eighty-Seven Years Of Doc Cheatham (Columbia), with Doc Cheatham
 1996: More Mellophonium Moods (Status), with Stan Kenton and his Orchestra
 1996: Alternate Routes (Tantara Productions), with Ray Starling, New York Neophonic Orchestra, Joel Kaye, New York Sound Stage One Orchestra	
 2010: This Is An Orchestra! (Tantara Productions), with Stan Kenton	
 2014: Horns Of Plenty, Vol. 3 (Tantara Productions), with Stan Kenton Orchestra and Trinity Big Band
 2017: Mellophonium Memoirs (Tantara Productions), with Stan Kenton Orchestra

References

External links 
 Video: Stan Kenton, 1962

1927 births
1995 deaths
American double-bassists
Male double-bassists
20th-century American musicians
20th-century double-bassists
20th-century American male musicians